The 1990–91 Gonzaga Bulldogs men's basketball team represented Gonzaga University in the West Coast Conference (WCC) during the 1990–91 NCAA Division I men's basketball season. Led by ninth-year head coach Dan Fitzgerald, the Bulldogs were  overall in the regular season  and played their home games on campus at the Charlotte Y. Martin Centre in Spokane, Washington.

Their first tournament wins came a year later in 1992; they advanced to the final, but fell by three to top-seeded Pepperdine.

Postseason results

|-
!colspan=6 style=| WCC tournament

References

External links
Sports Reference – Gonzaga Bulldogs men's basketball – 1990–91 season

Gonzaga Bulldogs men's basketball seasons
Gonzaga
1990 in sports in Washington (state)
1991 in sports in Washington (state)